Sisymbrium is a genus of plants in the family Brassicaceae.

Selected species
 Sisymbrium altissimum – Jim Hill mustard, tall rocket, tall tumblemustard
 Sisymbrium crassifolium
 Sisymbrium erysimoides
 Sisymbrium irio – London rocket
 Sisymbrium loeselii – False London rocket
 Sisymbrium officinale – Hedge mustard, used in some cuisines
 Sisymbrium orientale – Eastern rocket
 Sisymbrium strictissimum – Perennial rocket
 Sisymbrium turczaninowii
 Sisymbrium volgense – Russian mustard (syn. S. wolgense)

S. nasturtium-aquaticum is now a synonym of Nasturtium officinale, and S. tenuifolium – of Diplotaxis tenuifolia (perennial wall-rocket).

References

 
Brassicaceae genera